Tyseley Energy Recovery Facility is a waste incineration plant in Birmingham, UK. It is run by Veolia.

It was built in 1996 by Veolia to a design by Faulks Perry Culley & Rech. The plant has become a notable building in Birmingham with a lighting scheme that illuminates the plant during the hours of darkness. It was built to comply with the European emissions standards that came into force in 1996. Veolia benefits from Levy Exemption Certificates for the element of energy which is produced from renewable sources. This provides income to the City Council. The plant was opposed by Birmingham Friends of the Earth for contributing to climate change, causing air pollution and reducing recycling rates in the city.

The ERF operates 24 hours a day for 365 days a year (except for planned shutdowns for maintenance).  It takes around 350,000 tonnes of waste produced by the city annually and burns it to produce electricity, of which 25MW is fed into the National Grid. It is a two-stream plant with each boiler designed to process 23.5 tonnes of rubbish per hour. It has a turbo-generator which exports 25MW to the National Grid, after providing for on-site needs. The ERF also recovers several thousand tonnes a year of ferrous metals for recycling from the process.

References

External links

Veolia: Energy recovery

Buildings and structures in Birmingham, West Midlands
Energy infrastructure completed in 1996
Veolia
Waste power stations in England
Power stations in the East Midlands